The Evening News was a newspaper published in Rockhampton, Queensland, Australia.

History
This newspaper commenced on 3 January 1863 as the Northern Argus. It was published three times a week by Arthur Leslie Bourcicault. The editor was William Herbert Robison.

From 1 January 1875, it was published as the Daily Northern Argus. It was published daily by Arthur Leslie Bourcicault. The editor was Francis Hodgson Nixon.

From 2 January 1897, it was merged with the Record and was published as the Daily Record.

From 31 July 1922, it was published as The Evening News. The publisher was Walter Sewell Buzacott. The last issue was on 31 July 1941.

Digitisation 
The paper has been digitised as part of the Australian Newspapers Digitisation Program of the National Library of Australia.

References

External links
 

Defunct newspapers published in Queensland
Rockhampton
1863 establishments in Australia
Publications established in 1863
Publications disestablished in 1941
1941 disestablishments in Australia